Fritz Coetzee (born 4 June 1997) is a Namibian cricketer. He made his first-class debut for Namibia in the 2016–17 Sunfoil 3-Day Cup on 8 December 2016. Before his first-class debut, he was part of Namibia's squad for the 2016 Under-19 Cricket World Cup. He led the tournament in wickets, taking 15 wickets from 6 matches with a best of 3/16 against South Africa. In November 2016, he won the U19 Cricketer Award at Cricket Namibia's annual awards ceremony.

References

External links
 

1997 births
Living people
Namibian cricketers
Place of birth missing (living people)